Frederic DeGand (born June 6, 1979) is an American soccer defender who plays for Chicago Soul FC in the Major Indoor Soccer League.  He played professionally in the USL A-League and National Professional Soccer League.

DeGand played youth soccer for the Chicago Sockers which won the 1995 D.J. Niotis (National U-16) Championship.  He graduated from Deerfield High School.  DeGand attended Bowling Green State University where he was a four-year starter on the Falcons soccer team.  In 2001, he turned professional with the Hershey Wildcats of the USL A-League.   On June 4, 2001, D.C. United called up DeGand for a game against the Kansas City Wizards.  DeGand also went on loan to the Reading Rage of the USL D-3 Pro League.  In March 2002, DeGand joined the Cincinnati Riverhawks.  He finished the season with the Hampton Roads Mariners.  In 2003, the Charleston Battery signed DeGand after he impressed them during a three-week trial.
2003-  Cleveland Force  On October 29, 2003, DeGand signed with the Cleveland Force.  He spent a season and a half with the Force.  On January 5, 2005, Cleveland traded DeGand to the Chicago Storm in exchange for Attila Vendegh.  In 2004, DeGand joined the Atlanta Silverbacks.  He also spent some time with them in 2005, but also played two games with the Chicago Fire Reserves.  From 2005 to 2007, DeGand left soccer in order to recover from injuries, especially a torn anterior cruciate ligament.  In 2007, he returned to playing with the Rockford Rampage in the American Indoor Soccer League.  The Rampage won the league championship that season.  In 2009, Rockford moved to the National Indoor Soccer League, losing to the Baltimore Blast in the championship series.  DeGand continued to play for Rockford during the 2009–2010 season.  He played 36 games, scoring 14 goals, in the two seasons the Rampage played in the NISL. In the fall of 2010, DeGand, along with about eight other Rampage players, joined the newly established Chicago Riot in the third Major Indoor Soccer League.  In 2012, DeGand rejoined the Rampage, now playing in the Professional Arena Soccer League.  He moved to the Chicago Soul FC of the MISL after only one game.

References

External links
 
 Interview with Chicago Riot captain Fred DeGand

Living people
1979 births
American Indoor Soccer League players
American soccer players
Atlanta Silverbacks players
Bowling Green Falcons men's soccer players
Charleston Battery players
Chicago Storm players
Chicago Soul FC players
Cincinnati Riverhawks players
Cleveland Force (2002–2005 MISL) players
D.C. United players
Virginia Beach Mariners players
Hershey Wildcats players
Major Indoor Soccer League (2001–2008) players
Major Indoor Soccer League (2008–2014) players
Professional Arena Soccer League players
Rockford Rampage players
Reading United A.C. players
A-League (1995–2004) players
USL Second Division players
Association football defenders
Soccer players from Chicago